Tsarev or Tsareva means of czar in several Slavic languages, and may refer to:
Tsarev, Russia, a village in Volgograd Oblast in Russia

It may also refer to
Tsarev Brod, a village in northeastern Bulgaria
Tsareva Livada, a village in northern central Bulgaria
Tsareva Polyana, a village in southern Bulgaria

See also
Tsaryov
Gibbons–Tsarev equation